Marangu is a town located in Kilimanjaro Region. it is divided into Marangu East and Marangu west each with its own village, its one of the famous places in Tanzania recognized as one of the  main gate for climbing Mount Kilimanjaro. it is also famous for being a place where Mangi mkuu (Paramount chief) of chagga Thomas Lenana Marreale was born in Lyamrakana Village on June 15, 1915 who ruled in 1952 up to 1961 when chieftains was abolished..

History 
Before Independence in 1961, the town of Marangu used to be the headquarters of the Vunjo district led by Chief (Mangi Mwitori) Petro Itosi Marealle and Paramount Chief (Mangi Mkuu) Thomas Marealle, installed in 1951, who lived in Moshi itself.. The four and half day Marangu Route climb is considered the least arduous. It is believed that the first man in history to have climbed Kibo peak on Kilimanjaro was Kinyala Johannes Lauwo (1871–1996) of Ashira Marangu who allegedly died aged 125 years in May 1996

Etymology
The word "Marangu" means a place with too many water streams. It is one of the most popular places in Tanzania. One of the proverbs of Chagga is "Ulamine kilahu ulyemkiwoa" (not from the Vunjo dialect) which means do not despise something/somebody from which you once received support. it is located 119 kilometers from Arusha city and 39 kilometers from Moshi municipality.

Economy
Many Marangu residents are farmers growing bananas, vegetables and coffee. However, the biggest source of income is tourism. The Marangu route is the most popular hiking route in Africa. The town has world class hotels like Babylon Lodge, Kilimanjaro Mountain resort, hosting local and international guests wanting to climb Mount Kilimanjaro. New Marangu residents are young men from all over Tanzania looking to work in the tourism industry as porters and guides.

Education 
Marangu is home to The Marangu Teacher Training College and Ashira Girls High School and many other schools which provides education to not only marangu residents but to other residence from different places around Tanzania country

See also
 Tanzania
 Chaga
 Kilimanjaro Region
 Kilimanjaro National Park

References

Populated places in Kilimanjaro Region